The 2018 Dallas Fuel season was the first season of the Dallas Fuel's existence in the Overwatch League (OWL). After Envy Gaming acquired the Dallas franchise slot for the OWL on October 5, 2017, the roster and staff of Team EnVyUs was transferred to the Dallas Fuel. The Fuel struggled throughout the first three quarters of the season, winning only six games, largely due to the instability of their roster. The team also went through a head coaching change, releasing Kyle "KyKy" Souder and signing Aaron "Aero" Atkins. Dallas had their most successful stage in Stage 4 and qualified for the Stage 4 playoffs. However, they lost in the semifinals to the New York Excelsior. The team finished with a regular season record of 12–28 placing them tenth overall and did not qualify for the season playoffs.

Preceding offseason 
On September 20, 2017, Blizzard officially announced that Envy Gaming had acquired the Dallas-based Overwatch League franchise spot. All of the existing members of Team EnVyUs were transferred to the new team, the Dallas Fuel, which consisted of:
Timo "Taimou" Kettunen
Jonathan "HarryHook" Tejedor Rua
Sebastian "Chipshajen" Widlund
Christian "cocco" Jonsson
Hyeon "EFFECT" Hwang
Pongphop "Mickie" Rattanasangchod

The team announced the signing of popular player and streamer Brandon "Seagull" Larned three days later. Dallas rounded out their roster in late October, signing support player Scott "Custa" Kennedy on October 27 and tank player Félix "xQc" Lengyel on October 28.

Regular season 

Fuel's first-ever OWL regular season match was on January 10, 2018, and resulted in a 1–2 loss to the Seoul Dynasty. The first three quarters of the Fuel's season was plagued with player discipline issues and an inconsistent roster. On January 19, the Overwatch League suspended xQc for four games after he made anti-gay remarks towards a Houston Outlaws player the day before. The Fuel extended the suspension to the entirety of Stage 1 shortly after. Between Stages 1 and 2, the Fuel acquired damage players Dylan "aKm" Bignet and Kim "Rascal" Dong-jun from free agency and the London Spitfire, respectively. On March 8, in the middle of Stage 2, the Fuel signed tank player Son "OGE" Min-seok, maxing out their roster at 12 players. Two days later, xQc was suspended for another four matches, after he "used an emote in a racially disparaging manner on the league’s stream and on social media, and used disparaging language against Overwatch League casters and fellow players on social media and on his personal stream." The following day, on March 11, the Fuel released xQc. The Fuel's player discipline issues continued later on in the stage, as OGE received a four-game suspension on March 23 for account boosting, a process in which a player is paid to increase another player's skill rating, back in Summer 2017. On April 2, prior to the start of Stage 3, Dallas traded Custa to the Los Angeles Valiant in exchange for support player Benjamin "uNKOE" Chevasson. On April 15, the Fuel released head coach Kyle "KyKy" Souder and assistant coach Emanuel "Peak" Uzoni was named the interim head coach. Additionally, Rascal was released due to commitment issues and his unwillingness to communicate. Along with periodical absences, including missing most of Stage 3, during the season from Hwang "EFFECT" Hyeon, the Fuel amassed 24 losses in the first three stages; the six matches they won included three over the winless Shanghai Dragons.

On May 15, a day before the start of Stage 4, Dallas announced the signing of former Fusion University head coach Aaron "Aero" Atkins as their new head coach. The stage also saw the support hero Brigitte become a strong character to play; Fuel's Pongphop "Mickie" Rattanasangchod performed particularly well with the hero throughout the stage. The Fuel doubled their number of wins Stage 4, going 6–4, which included victories over top teams such as the Valiant, Uprising, Spitfire, and Fusion. The record would be good enough to claim the fourth seed in the Stage 4 playoffs. In the stage semifinals on June 16, the team lost to the New York Excelsior, 2–3. Dallas ended the season 10th place with a record of 12–28.

On August 23, Mickie, OGE, and Seagull were announced to represent the Fuel in the 2018 All-Star Game; however, Seagull announced his retirement before the game and was subsequently replaced by Los Angeles Gladiators tank player Bischu.

Final roster

Transactions 
Transactions of/for players on the roster during the 2018 regular season:
On February 13, Fuel signed Dylan "aKm" Bignet.
On February 13, Fuel acquired Kim "Rascal" Dong-jun from London Spitfire.
On March 8, Fuel signed Son "OGE" Min-seok.
On March 11, Fuel released Félix "xQc" Lengyel.
On April 2, Fuel traded Scott "Custa" Kennedy to Los Angeles Valiant in exchange for Benjamin "Unkoe" Chevasson.
On April 15, Fuel released Kim "Rascal" Dong-jun.

Standings

Record by stage

League

Game log

Preseason

Regular season

References 

2018 Overwatch League seasons by team
Dallas Fuel
Dallas Fuel seasons